Play It Now is an album by saxophonist Al Cohn which was recorded in 1975 and released on the Xanadu label.

Reception

The Allmusic review awarded the album 3 stars stating "Tenor saxophonist Al Cohn did some of his finest playing during his period (1975-80) with Xanadu".

Track listing 
 "You're My Everything" (Mort Dixon, Harry Warren, Joe Young) - 6:06   
 "Lover" (Lorenz Hart, Richard Rodgers) - 9:47   
 "Play It Now" (Al Cohn) - 5:02   
 "Irrestible You" (Don Raye, Gene De Paul) - 6:36   
 "Georgia on My Mind" (Hoagy Carmichael, Stuart Gorrell) - 6:26  
 "It's Sand, Man!" (Ed Lewis) - 5:40

Personnel 
Al Cohn - tenor saxophone
Barry Harris - piano
Larry Ridley - bass
Alan Dawson - drums

References 

Al Cohn albums
1975 albums
Xanadu Records albums
Albums produced by Don Schlitten